The Americas Zone was one of the three regional zones of the 1972 Davis Cup.

11 teams entered the Americas Zone: 4 teams competed in the North & Central America Zone, while 7 teams competed in the South America Zone. The winner of each sub-zone would play against each other to determine who moved to the Inter-Zonal Zone to compete against the winners of the Eastern Zone and Europe Zone.

The United States defeated Mexico in the North & Central America Zone final, and Chile defeated Brazil in the South America Zone final. In the Americas Inter-Zonal Final, the United States defeated Chile and progressed to the Inter-Zonal Zone.

North & Central America Zone

Draw

Semifinals
Caribbean/West Indies vs. United States

Canada vs. Mexico

Final
Mexico vs. United States

South America Zone

Draw

Quarterfinals
Brazil vs. Venezuela

Chile vs. Peru

Ecuador vs. Colombia

Semifinals
Brazil vs. Argentina

Chile vs. Colombia

Final
Brazil vs. Chile

Americas Inter-Zonal Final
Chile vs. United States

References

External links
Davis Cup official website

Davis Cup Americas Zone
America Zone
Davis Cup
Davis Cup
Davis Cup
Davis Cup
Davis Cup
Davis Cup